Greg Van Alst (born July 1, 1981) is an American professional stock car racing driver. He competes full-time in the ARCA Menards Series, driving the No. 35 Chevrolet SS for Greg Van Alst Motorsports.

Racing career

ARCA Menards Series 
Van Alst made his ARCA Menards Series debut in 2002, running three races at Kentucky, Chicagoland, and Salem. He managed his best finish at Chicagoland, coming home in 15th. He did not return to the series until 2021. Van Alst ran eight races and collected three top ten finishes. He finished seventh at Kansas, second at Winchester, and sixth at Michigan.

In 2023, Van Alst scored his first career win at Daytona.

ARCA Menards Series East 
Van Alst made his ARCA Menards Series East debut in 2021 at Bristol, finishing 15th.

Motorsports career results

ARCA Menards Series

ARCA Menards Series East

ARCA Menards Series West 
(key) (Bold – Pole position awarded by qualifying time. Italics – Pole position earned by points standings or practice time. * – Most laps led.)

References

External links 

 

1981 births
Living people
ARCA Menards Series drivers
NASCAR drivers
Racing drivers from Indiana
Sportspeople from Anderson, Indiana